Bernard Kops (born 28 November 1926) is a British dramatist, memoirist, poet and novelist.

Early life
Born in the East End of London, the son of Dutch-Jewish immigrants, Kops was evacuated from London in 1939, and recounted that experience in episode two of Thames Television’s TV series, The World at War, first broadcast in 1973.

Career
His first play, The Hamlet of Stepney Green, was produced at the Oxford Playhouse in 1957. It is considered to be one of the keystones of the "New Wave" in British 'kitchen sink' drama.

His subsequent plays include Enter Solly Gold (1962), Ezra (1981, about Ezra Pound), Playing Sinatra (1991) and The Dreams of Anne Frank (1992, about Anne Frank). He has also written extensively for radio and television. His radio play Monster Man (1999) is about the creator of "King Kong", Willis O'Brien.

Kops wrote the television movie script Just One Kid for director/producer John Goldschmidt; the film was transmitted on the ITV Network in 1974, and won a Silver Hugo Award at the Chicago Film Festival. Kops then wrote the television film It's a Lovely Day Tomorrow (1975), about the Bethnal Green tube disaster of 1943, also for John Goldschmidt, and this was nominated for an International Emmy Award for Drama Series.

He has published volumes of poetry, autobiography, several novels, and a memoir of the East End, Bernard Kops' East End (2006). He has also written travelogues, including a series of articles about a trip to the United States (1999) and another about a journey to China (2000), both written for The Guardian.

Personal life
In 1975, suffering from drug addiction, Kops made a suicide attempt; he writes about the incident and his successful journey to sobriety in his second autobiography, Shalom Bomb: Scenes from My Life.

Selected bibliography
Awake for Mourning (MacGibbon & Kee), 1958)
Motorbike (New English Library, 1962)
The World is a Wedding (MacGibbon & Kee, 1963)
Yes from No-Man's Land (MacGibbon & Kee, 1965)
The Dissent of Dominick Shapiro (MacGibbon & Kee, 1966)
By the Waters of Whitechapel (Bodley Head, 1969)
The Passionate Past of Gloria Gaye (Secker and Warburg, 1971)
For the Record – Poems (Secker and Warburg, 1971)
Settle Down Simon Katz (Secker and Warburg)
Partners (Secker and Warburg, 1975)
On Margate Sands (Secker and Warburg, 1978)
Neither Your Honey nor Your Sting: An Offbeat History of the Jews (Robson, 1985)
Plays One (Playing Sinatra, The Hamlet of Stepney Green, Ezra) (Oberon Books, 1999)
Plays Two (Dreams of Anne Frank, Cafe Zeitgeist, Call in the Night) (Oberon Books, 2000)
Plays Three (The Dream of Peter Mann, Enter Solly Gold, Who Shall I Be Tomorrow?) (Oberon Books, 2001)
Shalom Bomb: Scenes from My Life (Oberon Books, 2000)
Where Do People Go (The Happy Dragons' Press, 2004)
Bernard Kops East End (Five Leaves Publications, 2006)
This Room in the Sunlight: Collected Poems (David Paul, 2010)
The Odyssey of Samuel Glass (David Paul, 2012)
Anne Frank's Fragments from Nowhere (Indigo Dreams Publishing, 2015)
Love, Death and Other Joys (David Paul, 2018)

See also

Cultural depictions of Anne Frank
Emanuel Litvinoff

Notes

Literature
William Baker and Jeanette Roberts Shumaker: Bernard Kops - fantasist, London Jew, apocalyptic humorist, Madison [u.a.]: Fairleigh Dickinson University Press, 2014, .

External links
Bernard Kops Papers and additions at the Harry Ransom Center

List of Bernard Kops theatre plays at Doollee
List of Bernard Kops radio plays
Bernard Kops poetry at Jewish Book Week
Rooted in Poetry
Review of The Odyssey of Samuel Glass
Review of This Room in the Sunlight: Collected Poems, Dan Carrier Camden New Journal
The Bethnal Green Tube Disaster 3 March 1943. The largest civilian loss of life in WWll. 173 died.

1926 births
Living people
20th-century British dramatists and playwrights
20th-century British poets
British Jews
British male dramatists and playwrights
British male poets
English people of Dutch-Jewish descent
Jewish dramatists and playwrights